Marek Stępień (born 1 June 1964) is a Polish fencer. He competed in the team épée event at the 1992 Summer Olympics.

References

External links
 

1964 births
Living people
People from Kraśnik
Polish male fencers
Olympic fencers of Poland
Fencers at the 1992 Summer Olympics
Sportspeople from Lublin Voivodeship